Gander is a provincial electoral district for the House of Assembly of Newfoundland and Labrador, Canada.

It includes the town of Gander and the surrounding communities of Appleton, Gambo, Glenwood, and Benton. Gander, which has an airport and military history, is a service centre for a large region of the province. Voters in Gander often swing between the Liberal and Progressive Conservative columns, often electing members who sat on the government benches, making it an important swing district in the province.

Members of the House of Assembly
The district has elected the following Members of the House of Assembly:

Election results

References

External links 
 Website of the Newfoundland and Labrador House of Assembly

Gander, Newfoundland and Labrador
Newfoundland and Labrador provincial electoral districts